José Timoteo de la Paz Berges Villaalta (c. 1820 – 21 December 1868) was a Paraguayan diplomat who served as the Minister of Foreign Affairs during the rule of Paraguayan dictator Francisco Solano López and the Paraguayan War.

Like many prominent Paraguayans, Berges was accused of conspiring against López, arrested, severely tortured (he was "reduced to groveling idiocy") and shot for treason on 21 December 1868 in the San Fernando massacre. There was probably no conspiracy.

References

1820 births
1868 deaths
Year of birth uncertain
Foreign Ministers of Paraguay
People of the Paraguayan War